Grassmann's law, named after its discoverer Hermann Grassmann, is a dissimilatory phonological process in Ancient Greek and Sanskrit which states that if an aspirated consonant is followed by another aspirated consonant in the next syllable, the first one loses the aspiration. The descriptive version was given for Sanskrit by Pāṇini.

Here are some examples in Greek of the effects of Grassmann's law:

   'I sacrifice (an animal)';   'it was sacrificed'
   'hair';   'hairs'
   'to bury (present)';   'a grave'

In reduplication, which forms the perfect tense in both Greek and Sanskrit, if the initial consonant is aspirated, the prepended consonant is unaspirated by Grassmann's law. For instance   'I grow' :   'I have grown'.

Also, Grassmann's law in Greek also affects the aspirate  <  developed specifically in Greek but not in Sanskrit or most other Indo-European. The evidence from other languages is not strictly negative: many branches, including Sanskrit's closest relative, Iranian, merge the Proto-Indo-European voiced aspirated and unaspirated stops and so it is not possible to tell if Grassmann's law ever operated in them.

According to Filip De Decker, Grassmann's law had not operated in Mycenaean Greek yet, and it is almost certain that it occurred later than 1200 BC; it might even postdate the Homeric Greek period.

In Greek

Similarly,   ~   'come to know' from PIE  has the future  .

Diaspirate roots
Cases like  ~  and  ~  illustrate the phenomenon of diaspirate roots for which two different analyses have been given.

If a vowel follows the second aspirate, the second aspirate survives unaltered, and the first aspiration is thus lost by Grassmann's law.

A different analytical approach was taken by the Indian grammarians. If an  follows, it triggers an aspiration throwback and the aspiration migrates leftward, docking onto the initial consonant.

In his initial formulation of the law, Grassmann briefly referred to aspiration throwback to explain the seemingly aberrant forms.

In the later course of Sanskrit, under the influence of the grammarians, aspiration throwback was applied to original mono-aspirate roots by analogy.

The linguist Ivan Sag has pointed out an advantage of the ancient Indian theory: it explains why there are no patterns like hypothetical  ~ , which are not ruled out by the underlying diaspirate theory. However, aspiration fails to account for reduplication patterns in roots with initial aspirates, such as Greek  'I put', with an unaspirated reduplicated consonant. Aspiration throwback thus needs to be enhanced with a stipulation that aspirates reduplicate as their unaspirated counterparts. From a diachronic standpoint, the absence of these patterns in Greek is explained by the Proto-Indo-European constraint against roots of the form .

Other languages

A process similar to Grassmann's law is also known to occur in Ofo, an extinct and underdocumented Siouan language. The law is found in compounds such as the following:

 óskha ('the crane') + afháⁿ ('white') → oskạfha ('the white egret')

A similar phenomenon occurs in Meitei (a Tibeto-Burman language) in which an aspirated consonant is deaspirated if preceded by an aspirated consonant (including ) in the previous syllable. The deaspirated consonants are then voiced between sonorants.

  ('pierce') +  ('upward') →  ('pierce upwards')
  ('cow') +  ('udder') →  ('milk')
  ('trim') +  ('outward') →  ('trim outwards')

Hadza, spoken in Northern Tanzania, exhibits Grassmann's law in its lexicon, but most obviously in reduplication:
 'look at each other', from  'look'
In Hadza,  has no effect on aspiration.

A similar effect takes place in Koti and other Makhuwa languages, where it was dubbed Katupha's law in Schadeberg (1999).  If two aspirated consonants are brought together in one stem, the first loses its aspiration. The effect is particularly clear in reduplicated words: kopikophi 'eyelash'; piriphiri 'pepper' (cf. Swahili 'piripiri'); okukuttha 'to wipe'.  This is slightly different from in Greek and Sanskrit, in that the two syllables need not be adjacent.

The four Salishan languages Salish-Spokane-Kalispel, Okanagan, Shuswap and Tillamook exhibit a similar process affecting ejective rather aspirated consonants, which has been called "Grassmann's law for Salish", for example Shuswap underlying  'crutches' → surface .

See also
Dahl's law and Katupha's law, similar sound laws in Bantu languages
Graeco-Aryan

References

Sources
 
 Chelliah, Shobhana L. (1997). A Grammar of Meithei. Berlin: Mouton de Gruyter. .
 Reuse, Willem J. de (1981). "Grassmann's law in Ofo". International Journal of American Linguistics, 47 (3), 243–244.
Sag, Ivan A. (1974) "The Grassmann's Law Ordering Pseudoparadox," Linguistic Inquiry; 5, 591–607.
 Czaykowska-Higgins, Ewa & Kinkade, M. Dale (1998) Salish Languages and Linguistics, Trends in Linguistics. Studies and Monographs, 107, 1-68.

Indo-European linguistics
Sound laws